"Payback" is a song by the band Flaw. The song was released as a single from their major-label debut Through the Eyes.

Meaning
Flaw's vocalist Chris Volz spoke about the song's meaning saying

Track listing

Personnel

Main personnel
 Flaw – composer, primary artist
 Chris Volz – lead vocals, composer
 Jason Daunt – guitar
 Ryan Jurhs – bass, backing vocals
 Chris Ballinger – drums
 Lance Arny – guitar

Additional personnel
 David Bottrill – engineer, mixing, producer
 Phillip Broussaard – assistant engineer, assistant producer, mixing
 Sandy Brummels – creative director
 Bob Ludwig – mastering
 Clay Patrick McBridge – photography
 Justin Pynes – assistant
 Karen Walker – art direction, design

Charts

Music video
The music video shows a woman (portrayed by Heidi Marnhout) waking up on a bed in the middle of a forest at night. As she steps out, she steps on a ground of worms. She runs trying to escape the forest and sees a man in a bath tub full of grub worms and sees a tree with the word "RUN" both capitalized and in blood. The female also gets chased by somebody who appears to be a ghost. In the end, she wakes up believing it was just a dream but her feet are covered in mud and there are worms all over and around her clock. The band are in the music video performing in a forest.

Sources
Flaw - Payback (CD) at Discogs
Flaw - Payback (CD) at Discogs (Other version)
Through the Eyes - Flaw | Credits | Allmusic

References

External links
 Official music video

2001 songs
2001 singles
Universal Records singles
Flaw (band) songs
Republic Records singles